The 10th Canadian Film Awards were held on June 21, 1958 to honour achievements in Canadian film. The ceremony was hosted by Davidson Dunton, Chairman of the Canadian Broadcasting Corporation.

Winners

Film of the Year: City of Gold — National Film Board of Canada, Tom Daly producer, Colin Low and Wolf Koenig directors
Feature Film: No entries submitted
Theatrical Short: The Sceptre and the Mace — National Film Board of Canada, Nicholas Balla producer, John Howe director
Arts and Experimental: Legend of the Raven — Crawley Films, Judith Crawley producer
A Chairy Tale — National Film Board of Canada, Norman McLaren and Claude Jutra directors
City of Gold — National Film Board of Canada, Tom Daly producer, Colin Low and Wolf Koenig directors
TV Information: Skidrow — Canadian Broadcasting Corporation, Allan King producer
Films for Children: En roulant ma boule — Studio 7
Travel and Recreation: Stampede Stopover — Master Film Studios
General Information: Canadian Profile — National Film Board of Canada, Tom Daly producer, Allan Wargon director
Canadian Wheat — Crawley Films, J. Stanley Moore producer and director
Public Relations: Generator 4 — Crawley Films F. R. Crawley producer and director
Sales Promotion: Spirit of Algonquin — Ashley and Crippen, Edward Rollins producer, Douglas Sinclair director
Training and Instruction: From Ten to Twelve — Crawley Films, Judith Crawley producer and director
Emotional Maturity — Crawley Films, George Gorman producer and director
Filmed Commercial: Orlon Acrylic Fibre — Omega Productions, Pierre Harwood producer
Amateur: Three Pairs of Shoes — Ki-Wi Film Club of Hamilton
Special Award: 
Imperial Oil — "for its encouragement of high standards in Canadian film productions".

References

Canadian
Canadian Film Awards (1949–1978)
1958 in Canada